New Hope is an unincorporated community and census-designated place (CDP) in Josephine County, Oregon, United States. As of the 2010 census it had a population of 1,515.

Geography
The community lies just north of the Applegate River, a northwest-flowing tributary of the Rogue River.

Demographics

References

Unincorporated communities in Josephine County, Oregon
Census-designated places in Oregon
Census-designated places in Josephine County, Oregon
Unincorporated communities in Oregon